Glory By Honor XI: The Unbreakable Hope was the 11th Glory By Honor professional wrestling internet pay-per-view (iPPV) event produced by Ring of Honor (ROH). It took place on October 13, 2012, at the International Centre in Mississauga, Ontario.

Storylines
Glory By Honor XI: The Unbreakable Hope featured professional wrestling matches which involved different wrestlers from pre-existing scripted feuds, plots, and storylines that played out on ROH's television programs. Wrestlers portrayed villains or heroes as they followed a series of events that built tension and culminated in a wrestling match or series of matches.

Results

See also

Professional wrestling in Canada

References

External links
Ring of Honor's official website

Ring of Honor pay-per-view events
2012 in Ontario
Events in Ontario
11
Professional wrestling in Ontario
October 2012 events in the United States
2012 Ring of Honor pay-per-view events